The Potato Bag Gang, a manifestation of the Odessa mafia, was a gang of con artists from Odessa that operated in New York City's Soviet émigré community in the Brighton Beach area of New York City in the mid-1970s.

Criminal activity
Posing as merchant sailors, they would offer to sell victims bags full of antique gold rubles for thousands of dollars each. In reality, only the sample coin was authentic, and the bags were full of potatoes.

See also
Ukrainian mafia
Russian mafia

References

Further reading

Fraud in the United States
Former gangs in New York City
1970s in New York City
1970s crimes in New York City